Richard Morton (1637–1698) was an English physician who was the first to state that tubercles were always present in the tuberculosis disease of the lungs. In Morton's time, this wasting disease was termed consumption, or by its Greek name of phthisis.  Recognition of the many possible symptoms of this infection belonging to a single disease was not until the 1820s and it was J.L. Schönlein in 1839 who introduced the term "tuberculosis".

Life
He was born in Worcestershire, England and, having trained at Oxford's Magdalen Hall, elected to enter the Church, becoming Vicar of Kinver in Staffordshire. With his refusal to acquiesce to the Act of Uniformity 1662 following the Restoration of Charles II, he was forced to resign. His whereabouts for the following eight years are unclear, although he probably travelled to Holland. Reappearing in 1670, he was awarded doctorate of medicine by Oxford University.

Works
His landmark paper Phthisiologia, seu exercitationes de phthisi, tribus libris comprehensæ. Totumque opus variis historiis illustratum was published in Latin in 1689, with an English translation appearing in 1694.  A second English edition was published in 1720.   Its significance is partly due to the disease receiving little study by other doctors of the time despite it being a major cause of death; accounting for over 18% all deaths in the City of London in 1700. The paper is also significant in that it also contains the first recognised medical descriptions of the wasting condition now known as Anorexia Nervosa. 

Medicine of that time was deferential to the ideas of Galen and so Morton understandably mistook tubercles for being caused by glandular degenerations; mycobacterium tuberculosis not being identified until 1882 by Robert Koch.

References
 
 
 
 

British pulmonologists
English microbiologists
17th-century English medical doctors
Ejected English ministers of 1662
People from Kinver
Medical doctors from Worcestershire
1637 births
1698 deaths
Alumni of Magdalen Hall, Oxford